Felicia Mercado (born Felicia Mercado Agud on December 17, 1959) is a Mexican actress, singer and TV hostess, best known for her appearances in telenovelas . She appeared in Between Love and Hatred and Teresa. Her first role in Telemundo was of Eva in La Casa de al Lado. She played Valeria Samaniego in El Rostro de la Venganza and Estela in Dama y Obrero (2013).

Biography

Miss Mexico

Born in Tijuana, Baja California, the daughter of Ofelia Agud and José Luis Mercado, Felicia began her career by entering Miss Mexico 1977. Winning the contest gave her the right to represent Mexico in Miss Universe 1977 held in the Dominican Republic. She then began acting, appearing in the telenovela  I won, I was starring Mexican diva Angélica María. During that time she appeared in many films.

Rosa Salvaje
In 1987, she shot to fame when she replaced the actress Edith González in the telenovela Rosa Salvaje, playing the evil Leonela Villarreal.

Sortilegio 
In 2010 Felicia made a brief appearance in the telenovela Sortilegio. She played Adriana de Lombardo.

Personal life
In 1997 she married Eugene Santoscoy. One year later her daughter Ivana Francesca was born.

Filmography

Telenovelas

Films 
 Tres de presidio (1980)
 El sátiro (1981)
 Ok Mister Pancho (1981)
 Viva el chubasco (1983)
 El rey de oros (1984) ... María
 Narco terror (1985)
 La chica de la piscina (1987) ... Marcela
 Se vende esposa en buenísimo estado (1988)
 Con el odio en la piel (1988)
 Cacería implacable (1988)
 Cacería de recompensas (1989) ... María Niebla
 La ley de las calles (1989)
 Un macho en reformatorio de señoritas (1989)
 Guerra de bikinis (1990)
 Investigador privado... muy privado (1990) 
 Zapatero a tus zapatos (1990) 
 La soplona (1990) 
 Pleito de perdedores (1990) 
 Noche de pánico (1990) 
 Las dos caras de la muerte (1990) 
 La pisca de la muerte (1990) 
 Traficantes del vicio (1990)  
 La caida de Noriega (1990) 
 Prisión sin ley (1990)
 Los cuates del pirruris (1991) ... Silvana  
 El ninja mexicano (1991) 
 The Last Riders (1991) .... Mitsy 
 Las caguamas ninjas (1991) .... Martita 
 Esa mujer me vuelve loco (1991) .... Sandra 
 La huella (1991) .... Marlene Torre 
  (1991) .... Elena Gazcón 
 Muerte por partida doble (1991) .... Amelia 
 Secreto sangriento (1991) .... Ángelica 
 El lambiscon verde (1991) 
 Trampa mortal (1992) .... Sandra Lee 
 Sueños sangrientos (1992)
 Chicas en peligro (1993)
 Dónde quedó la bolita (1993) 
 La voz de los caracoles (1993) 
 Infancia violenta (1993)
 Muerte en altamar (1994) 
 Escuadrón de honor (1995) 
  (1995) 
 Las calenturas de Juan Camaney III (1996)
 Metiche y encajoso IV (1997) 
 AR-15 Comando Implacable II (1997) .... Sagrario 
 Cristal: Ambición mortal (1997) 
 Pesadilla infernal (1997) 
 Del norte a la gran ciudad (1998)

See also 
List of Between Love and Hatred characters
Señorita México

References

External links

1959 births
20th-century Mexican actresses
21st-century Mexican actresses
Actresses from Baja California
Living people
Mexican female models
Mexican women singers
Mexican film actresses
Mexican telenovela actresses
Mexican television actresses
Mexican television presenters
Mexican television talk show hosts
Mexican vedettes
Miss Universe 1977 contestants
People from Tijuana
Singers from Baja California
Mexican women television presenters